Ruydar (also Romanized as Rūydar, Rooydar, Rowdar, and Rūy-e Dar) is a city and capital of Ruydar District, in Khamir County, Hormozgan Province, Iran. At the 2006 census, its population was 5,470, in 1,236 families. Ruydar is located 87 km northwest of Bandar Khamir and 120 km from Bandar Abbas. [1] The municipality of this city was inaugurated on July 27, 2008 by the Governor of Hormozgan.

References

3. Abullah Dardari student of shahid haghani sampad

Cities in Hormozgan Province
Populated places in Khamir County
Port cities and towns in Iran